The 1951 Oregon State Beavers football team represented Oregon State College in the 1951 NCAA college football season. The Beavers ended this season with four wins and six losses.  The Beavers scored 204 points and allowed 180 points. The team was led by head coach Kip Taylor.

Schedule

Sources:

References

Oregon State
Oregon State Beavers football seasons
Oregon State Beavers football